Opinion journalism is journalism that makes no claim of objectivity. Although distinguished from advocacy journalism in several ways, both forms feature a subjective viewpoint, usually with some social or political purpose. Common examples include newspaper columns, editorials, op-eds, editorial cartoons, and punditry.

Unlike advocacy journalism, opinion journalism has a reduced focus on facts or research and its perspective is often of a more personalized variety. Its product may be only one component of a generally objective news outlet, rather than the dominant feature of an entire publication or broadcast network.

There are a number of journalistic genres that are opinion-based. Among them, for example, there is Gonzo journalism and New Journalism.

See also
Opinion piece

External links

whocomments? - encyclopedia of comment & opinion